Kanga is a Kadu language spoken in Kordofan.

Kufo, Abu Sinun, Chiroro, Krongo Abdullah, and Kanga proper are dialects.

The Kufa-Lima dialect is spoken in Bilenya, Dologi, Lenyaguyox, Lima, Kilag, Kufa, Mashaish, and Toole villages, with Toole as the central village.

A preliminary grammar of the Kufa-Lima variety (termed "Kufo") has been published recently.

References

External links
 Kanga basic lexicon at the Global Lexicostatistical Database

Languages of Sudan
Kadu languages
Severely endangered languages